Norah Lange (October 23, 1905 – August 5, 1972) was a Norwegian-Argentine writer, who was associated with the Buenos Aires avant garde of the 1920s and 1930s.

Life

A member of the Florida group, which also included figures such as Oliverio Girondo (whom she married in 1943) and Jorge Luis Borges (who dedicated an article to her in his first book of prose, Inquisiciones), she published in the "ultraist" magazines Prisma, Proa, and Martín Fierro.

Her ultra-modernist poetry influenced other well-known Argentine writers such as Nydia Lamarque, Maria Elena Walsh, Maria Dhialma Tiberti, and Ines Malinow.

Her 1950 novel Personas en la sala was published in English as People in the Room (trans. Charlotte Whittle) by And Other Stories in 2018.

In 1958, SADE (the Argentine Society of writers) awarded her their Grand Prize of Honor.

Works

Poetry
 La calle de la tarde (The Street in the Evening, 1925), with a prologue by Borges
 Los días y las noches (Days and Nights, 1926)
 El rumbo de la rosa (1930)

Prose
 Voz de la vida (The Voice of Life, 1927), novel
 45 días y 30 marineros (45 Days and 30 Sailors, 1933), novel
 Cuadernos de infancia (Childhood Notebooks, 1937), autobiographical work, received the Buenos Aires Municipal Prize and the Argentine National Second Prize.
 Discursos (Speeches, 1942), speeches
 Antes que mueran (Before They Die, 1944), autobiographical work
 Personas en la sala (People in the Room, 1950), novel
 Los dos retratos (The Two Portraits, 1956), novel
 Estimados congéneres

References

External links
 Al rescate de Norah Lange, la dama de la vanguardia del 20

1905 births
Argentine people of Norwegian descent
Argentine people of Scandinavian descent
1972 deaths
Argentine women poets
Place of birth missing
Burials at La Recoleta Cemetery
20th-century Argentine women writers
20th-century Argentine writers
20th-century Argentine poets
Argentine women novelists
20th-century Argentine novelists